Gergely Nagy (born 27 May 1994) is a Hungarian professional footballer who plays as a goalkeeper for Paks.

Club career
On 13 July 2021, Nagy returned to Paks on a three-year contract.

Career statistics

Club

References

External links
MLSZ 
HLSZ 

1994 births
Living people
People from Cegléd
Hungarian footballers
Hungary youth international footballers
Hungary under-21 international footballers
Association football goalkeepers
Nemzeti Bajnokság II players
Nemzeti Bajnokság I players
Super League Greece players
Győri ETO FC players
Dunaújváros PASE players
Vasas SC players
Paksi FC players
Athlitiki Enosi Larissa F.C. players
Hungarian expatriate footballers
Expatriate footballers in Greece
Hungarian expatriate sportspeople in Greece
Sportspeople from Pest County
21st-century Hungarian people